Eudulophasia is a genus of moths in the family Geometridae erected by William Warren in 1897.

Species
 Eudulophasia invaria (Walker, 1854)
 Eudulophasia nigricosta (H. Edwards, 1884)
 Eudulophasia unicolor (Möschler, 1878)

References

Eudulini
Taxa named by William Warren (entomologist)
Moth genera